The 2015 Rugby Europe Sevens Olympic Repechage Tournament was held on 18–19 July in Lisbon to determine the three teams that joined Spain at the final Olympic qualifying tournament, made up of the eight non-qualified Grand Prix teams, the top three teams of Division A and the champion of Division B. Russia won the European tournament, and qualified for the 2016 Final Olympic Qualification Tournament along with runner-up Germany and third place Ireland.

Teams

  (Grand Prix 4th)
  (Grand Prix 5th)
  (Grand Prix 6th)
  (Grand Prix 8th)
  (Grand Prix 9th)
  (Grand Prix 10th)
  (Grand Prix 11th)
  (Grand Prix 12th)
  (Division A winner)
  (Division A 2nd)
  (Division A 3rd)
  (Division B winner)

Standings

Pool stage

Pool A

Pool B

Pool C

Knockout stage

Bowl

Plate

Cup

References

See also
 2015 Rugby Europe Women's Sevens Olympic Repechage Tournament

Repechage
Europe Repechage
Europe Repechage
International rugby union competitions hosted by Portugal
2015–16 in European rugby union
2015 in Portuguese sport
Rugby
2015
July 2015 sports events in Europe